Charles Adolphus Murray, 7th Earl of Dunmore VD (24 March 1841 – 27 August 1907), styled Viscount Fincastle from birth until 1845, was a Scottish peer, Conservative politician, explorer, author, and artist.

Early life
Fincastle was the eldest son of Alexander Murray, 6th Earl of Dunmore and his wife, Catherine. His maternal grandmother was the Russian noblewoman Countess Catherine Woronzoff (or Vorontsova), daughter of the Russian ambassador to St James's, Semyon Romanovich Vorontsov.

He was born in London on March 34, 1841; and on July 16, 1845 he succeeded his father as Earl. He received his education at Eton College.

Career
He traveled to North America to observe the American Civil War with a number of other British officers. He then traveled at least as far as southern Manitoba and painted a number of watercolors across the United States and Canada.

In 1874, he was appointed a Lord-in-waiting in Disraeli's government, a post he held until 1880.

In 1875, he was made Lord Lieutenant of Stirlingshire, which he remained until 1885. In 1882 he was appointed lieutenant-colonel of the 1st Inverness-shire Rifle Volunteers (later the 1st Volunteer Battalion, Queen's Own Cameron Highlanders). He retired in 1896.

In 1883, the Canadian Pacific Railway named Dunmore, Alberta in his honour.

In 1892–93 he traveled through the eastern Pamirs to Kashgar. He was engaged in some form of diplomacy or espionage but the matter is not clear.

Family
Lord Dunmore married Lady Gertrude Coke, third daughter of Thomas Coke, 2nd Earl of Leicester, on 5 April 1866. They had six children:

Alexander Edward, styled Viscount Fincastle, later 8th Earl of Dunmore (1871–1962)
Lady Evelyn Cobbold (1867–1963), married John Dupuis Cobbold.
Lady Muriel (d. 1946), married Harold Gore Browne.
Lady Grace (1873–1960), married William James Barry, Esq.
Lady Victoria Alexandrina (1877–1925)
Lady Mildred (1878–1969), married (1) Gilbert Follet, (2) Sir John FitzGerald, 3rd Baronet.

Works

Notes

References

External links

 

Longyear Museum (Charles Murray, 7th Earl of Dunmore) connection with Christian Science

Earls of Dunmore
Conservative Party (UK) Baronesses- and Lords-in-Waiting
Queen's Own Cameron Highlanders officers
Deputy Lieutenants of Inverness-shire
Lord-Lieutenants of Stirlingshire
1841 births
1907 deaths
Explorers of Central Asia
British people of Russian descent
Charles
Nairne, Charles Murray, 7th Earl of
English Christian Scientists